Hong Chol is a male former international table tennis player from North Korea.

He won a bronze medal at the 1987 World Table Tennis Championships in the Swaythling Cup (men's team event) with Chu Jong-Chol, Kim Song-hui and Li Gun-Sang for North Korea.

He also won a bronze medal at the Asian Games in 1978.

See also
 List of table tennis players
 List of World Table Tennis Championships medalists

References

North Korean male table tennis players
Asian Games medalists in table tennis
Table tennis players at the 1978 Asian Games
Medalists at the 1978 Asian Games
Asian Games bronze medalists for North Korea
World Table Tennis Championships medalists
20th-century North Korean people